Henry Selfe Page Winterbotham (2 March 1837 – 13 December 1873) was an English lawyer and  Liberal Party politician who sat in the House of Commons from 1867 to 1873.

Winterbotham was the son of Lindsey Winterbotham, a banker, of Stroud and his wife Sarah Anne Selfe Page. He was educated at Amersham School, Buckinghamshire, and at University College, London, graduating with honours, BA in 1856, and LLB in 1859. He was a Hume Scholar in Jurisprudence in 1858, and a Hume Scholar in Political Economy and University Law Scholar in 1859. In 1860, he was elected Fellow of his college and called to the bar at Lincoln's Inn. He was in practice at the chancery bar and as a conveyancer.
 
Winterbotham was as an elected Member of Parliament (MP) for Stroud at a by-election on 20 August 1867 and held the seat until his death in 1873. In 1870 he was appointed Under-Secretary of State for the Home Department, an office he held until his death.

Winterbotham died in Rome in December 1873, aged 36, allegedly from overwork. His brother Arthur Brend Winterbotham was also a Member of Parliament.

References

External links

1837 births
1873 deaths
Liberal Party (UK) MPs for English constituencies
UK MPs 1868–1874
UK MPs 1865–1868
Alumni of University College London
Members of Lincoln's Inn
Burials in the Protestant Cemetery, Rome